The University of Pereslavl (Russian Университет города Переславля имени А. К. Айламазяна) is a non-state higher educational institution in Pereslavl-Zalessky, Russia, which operated in the period 1992–2017.

History 
The university was opened on November 26, 1992, on the initiative of Academician Evgeny Velikhov. Over 25 years of existence, the university has trained more than 900 graduates.

In 2017, due to financial difficulties, the university terminated its training activities and the state license was not renewed.

External links
University of Pereslavl Website 

Pereslavl
Pereslavl-Zalessky
Buildings and structures in Yaroslavl Oblast
Educational institutions established in 1993
1993 establishments in Russia